Simone Magill (born 1 November 1994) is a Northern Irish professional footballer who plays forward for Northern Ireland and Aston Villa in the FA Women’s Super League

Playing career

Club

Mid-Ulster
Magill began her football career in the development programs of Cookstown Youth FC and Mid-Ulster Ladies F.C. where she first played with an all female squad. During the 2010/2011 and 2011/2012 seasons, Magill would claim awards for the Northern Ireland Women's Premier League Player of the Year honors. She also finished the 2012 season as top goalscorer with 18 goals.

Everton
When she was 18, Magill made the move to WSL Side Everton L.F.C. after a successful trial in 2013 and later won Fans' Player of the Season in 2014/15. Suffering injury, Magill was sidelined for much for the 2016 season, but returned by the during the 2017 Spring Series scoring 5 goals in just 7 appearances.

In June 2017, Magill signed her first full-time professional contract with Everton. She was the second Everton player to do so and the first female Northern Irish footballer to sign a full-time contract.  In May 2019 Magill won Everton's Player of the Season Award.

International
Magill has represented Northern Ireland at multiple youth levels throughout her career and made her senior international debut aged 15. She has captained the U-17 and U-19 squads.

In June 2016, Magill claimed herself a world record by scoring the fastest ever goal at international women's level in a European Qualifying match against Georgia. The 11-second goal beat the previous 12-second record scored by US forward, Alex Morgan.

International goals

Honours 
Everton
 FA Women's Cup runners-up (1): 2013–14
 FA WSL 2 Winners (1): 2017

Individual
 Women's Premier League Player of the Year: 2010, 2012
 Everton Ladies Player of the Season: 2014–15
 Fastest International Women's goal scored (World Record) 3 June 2016
 Everton Ladies Player of the Season: 2018–19

References

External links 

 
 
 

1994 births
Living people
Everton F.C. (women) players
Women's association footballers from Northern Ireland
Northern Ireland women's international footballers
Women's Super League players
Women's association football forwards
UEFA Women's Euro 2022 players

Aston Villa W.F.C. players